Eddy Carbonnelle (23 October 1926 – 23 January 2004) was a Belgian field hockey player. He competed in the men's tournament at the 1960 Summer Olympics.

References

External links
 

1926 births
2004 deaths
Belgian male field hockey players
Olympic field hockey players of Belgium
Field hockey players at the 1960 Summer Olympics
Sportspeople from Tournai